Bayg Rural District is a rural district (dehestan) in Bayg District, Torbat-e Heydarieh County, Razavi Khorasan Province, Iran. At the 2006 census, its population was 4,367, in 1,359 families.  The rural district has 8 villages.

References 

Rural Districts of Razavi Khorasan Province
Torbat-e Heydarieh County